The 2022–23 Israel State Cup (Gvia HaMedina) was the 84rd season of Israel's nationwide Association football cup competition and the 68th after the Israeli Declaration of Independence.

Preliminary rounds

Liga Bet
 Schedule: 
 Results:

Liga Bet North A

Liga Bet North B

Liga Bet South A

Liga Bet South B

The Winner and the Runners-up from each regional divisions qualified to the sixth round .

Liga Gimel
Sources:
 Schedule: 
 Results:

Liga Gimel Upper Galilee

Liga Gimel Lower Galilee

Liga Gimel Jezreel

Liga Gimel Samaria

Liga Gimel Sharon

Liga Gimel Central

Liga Gimel Tel Aviv

Liga Gimel South

The Winner from each regional division qualified to the sixth round .

Fifth round
The fifth Round is played within each division of Liga Alef. The winners qualify to the sixth Round

Sixth Round

The Sixth Round is played in two District area (North and South) within the team are qualify from the Preliminary and the fifth Round.

Seventh Round

In the Seventh Round played the 16 teams are qualify from the sixth and 12 teams from second division (Hapoel Petah Tikva, Hapoel Acre, Hapoel Umm al-Fahm and Hapoel Nir Ramat HaSharon) were pre-qualified for the Next Round.

Eight Round
Source:

Round of 16

Quarter-finals
Unlike the other competitions stages, the quarterfinals will be held in a two-legged format. The draw was held on 5 January 2023 at 14:00 local time.

|}

Semi-final
The two semifinals matches will be held at the Sammy Ofer Stadium in Haifa.

Final

References

State Cup
Israel State Cup seasons
Israel